Cleave is the fifteenth studio album by the rock band Therapy?, and the first album to be released on new UK label Marshall Records, part of the Marshall Amplification company.

Background 
Produced by Chris Sheldon, who previously produced Troublegum and Semi-Detached, it was released on 21 September 2018. Demo sessions for the album began at Blast Studios in Newcastle in late 2017. The album proper was recorded from 15 January to 8 February 2018 at Blast Studios.

Pre-orders of the album became available on 25 June 2018 through Pledge Music and included a signed CD, LP, coloured LP (limited edition of 500), white label test pressing LP (limited to 10), handwritten lyric sheets and an exclusive T-shirt.

A digital-only single called "Callow" was released on 25 May 2018.  A promo video directed by Sitcom Soldiers was premiered a month later on 25 June 2018.

A second digital single called "Wreck It Like Beckett" was released on 7 September 2018, accompanied by a lyric video.

"Kakistocracy" was released as a digital only single on 15 February 2019.

A lyric video for the song "Success? Success Is Survival" was released on 8 August 2019.

Singles 
"Callow" released 25 May 2018 as a digital-only single.
"Wreck It Like Beckett" released 7 September 2018 as a digital-only single.
"Kakistocracy" released 15 February 2019 as a digital-only single.

Promo videos 
"Callow" (directed by 'Sitcom Soldiers')
"Kakistocracy"

Early performances 
An acoustic version of "Crutch" was debuted live by Andy Cairns at a session filmed for Audio Production Workshop in the UK on 17 April 2017. New song "Flashback Jack" was first played live at the Parkpop Festival in Netherlands on 23 June 2017. "Expelled" (then called "Spat Out") was played live at a gig in Athens on 24 November 2017. "Callow" was debuted live at a gig in Milton Keynes on 5 March 2018 and has remained in the set since. "Wreck It Like Beckett" was played live at a gig in Aachen on 7 June 2018 and subsequent gigs.

Track listing 
All lyrics by Andrew James Cairns.

Personnel 
Therapy?
Andy Cairns – vocals, guitar
Neil Cooper – drums
Michael McKeegan – bass
Technical
Chris Sheldon – producer, engineer, mixer
Anthony Mills – assistant producer, engineer, mixer
Nigel Rolfe – artwork concept/photography
Tom Hoad – photography
Paul Burgess – design

Charts

References

External links 
 

2018 albums
Therapy? albums
Albums produced by Chris Sheldon